Land Titles Building may refer to:

Canada
 Alberta
Land Titles Building – Victoria Armoury (Edmonton)
 Saskatchewan
 Land Titles Building (Arcola)
 Land Titles Building (Moose Jaw)
 Land Titles Building (Prince Albert)
 Land Titles Building (Saskatoon)